Pomnyun Sunim (Korean: 법륜스님, Hanja: 法輪; born 11 April 1953) is a Seon master, author, and activist.

Pomnyun Sunim is the head master of Jungto Society Korea, an organization dedicated to a life of sharing and simple, sustainable living, informed by Buddhist teachings, environmental outreach, and supporting peace in Korea and around the world.
He addresses the role Buddhism has played in defining modern Asia's religious, cultural, social, political, and economic dynamics. His dedication to Buddhist ideals has not only earned him accolades for his work, but has shaped his outlook on the prospects for peace and reconciliation between North and South Korea. Pomnyun Sunim has also established the Peace Foundation which aims to engage experts in analyzing how best to bring about peace between the two Koreas and between North Korea and the United States, as well as bringing together Buddhists and Christians in dialogue on the subject of world peace. He also established Good Friends for Peace, Human Rights, and Refugee Issues, an organization that aims for peace in North Korea. Through his work, thousands of people in North Korea have received aid during times of famine.

When Good Friends began publishing its newsletter in 2004, it became an isource of information smuggled out of the isolated country. 
Pomnyun Sunim has worked extensively to supply humanitarian aid to famine victims in North Korea and to defend the human rights of North Korean refugees in China.

In September 2002, Pomnyun Sunim was a recipient of the Ramon Magsaysay Award for Peace and International Understanding.

Books

In English

See also
Buddhism in Korea
Buddhism in the United States
 List of peace activists

Media

External links 
Pomnyun.com

1953 births
Korean Buddhist monks
Zen Buddhist monks
South Korean activists
Ramon Magsaysay Award winners
People from Ulsan
Living people